Viscount Philippe de Spoelberch (23 May 1941) is a Belgian businessman and dendrologist.

Family 

He is the son of Vicomte Werner de Spoelberch (1902-1987) and Eléonore de Haas de Teichen (1916). He is married to Diane, Vicomtesse de Jonghe d'Ardoye.

Career 
He is an administrator of the InBev-Baillet Latour Fund, and a former member of the board of the Brazilian conglomerate InBev, one of the biggest breweries in the world. With an estimated fortune of more than three billion euros, he is one of Belgium's wealthiest people.

A keen gardener he is président of the Belgische Dendrologie Belge. He is also President of the International Dendrology Society. He was awarded the Veitch Memorial Medal of the Royal Horticultural Society in 2003.

In 2007 he donated the Arboretum Wespelaar to the Foundation Arboretum Wespelaar, which was set up to guarantee the future of the collections and arrange for their opening to the public in 2011.

Bibliography 
 Bomen in België : dendrologische inventaris 1987 - 1992 / Jean-Claude Baudouin, Philippe de Spoelberch, Jef Van Meulder. -Brussel : Stichting Spoelberch-Artois, 1992
 Arboretum Robert Lenoir : molen van Bardonwez te Rendeux / Philippe de Spoelberch, Jean-Claude Baudouin

References

 Philippe de Spoelberch weg bij InBev 
 INBEV-BAILLET LATOUR FUND 

1941 births
Living people
Belgian businesspeople
Philippe
Veitch Memorial Medal recipients
Dendrologists
20th-century Belgian botanists
AB InBev people
21st-century Belgian botanists